"Adult Diversion" is a song by Canadian indie pop band Alvvays. The song was released on October 28, 2013 as the second single from their eponymous debut album. Written by vocalist and guitarist Molly Rankin,  guitarist Alec O'Hanley, and bassist Brian Murphy, it is sung from the perspective a lover who develops an "unhealthy fixation" on their partner.

The song was produced by Chad VanGaalen and recorded at his studio, Yoko Eno, in Calgary, Alberta. It was accompanied by a music video, filmed on a Super 8 camera, featuring footage of the band performing and hanging out at the beach. "Adult Diversion" was the second song the band released; it debuted digitally via the band's website before the band was signed to a label. In the band's home country, it was later released on Royal Mountain Records; in the U.S. and Europe, it was distributed through Polyvinyl and Transgressive Records, respectively.

Background
The song was born out of Rankin's boredom while working at a smoothie hut in Toronto, where the band had recently relocated. "Only one or two people would come in during the day and usually only to use the washroom. That song spawned out of admiration from afar and spending a large chunk of time alone." Exclaim! contributor Sarah Greene  described it as "a love song written from the perspective of a drunk stalker."

Reception
"Adult Diversion" was instrumental in developing momentum for the group, who signed to Canadian indie label Royal Mountain a month after the single's release in October 2013.  They were subsequently signed to US-based Polyvinyl Records, who released a 7" record of "Adult Diversion", with "Archie, Marry Me" on the A-side, exclusively to mail-order subscribers.

Simon Vozick-Levinson from Rolling Stone called the track an "instant rush of jangly emotion," while Stuart Berman at Pitchfork also complimented its "buoyant surf-tingled jangle." Sam Willett at Consequence of Sound dubbed the tune a "whimsical dream jam" that reaches "staggering highs"; he praised its "perfectly-sewn guitar arrangements and sweet female vocals." Gabrielle Sierra, writing for Billboard called the single catchy, highlighting its "dreamy, deadpan vocals and retro sound."

Track listing

Cassette

Personnel
Credits adapted from Alvvays liner notes.
Alvvays
 Molly Rankin - guitar, vocals, songwriting
 Alec O'Hanley – guitar, vocals, keyboards, additional mixing
 Brian Murphy – bass guitar
 Chris Dadge – drums

Production
 Chad VanGaalen – producer, recording engineer, programmer, tambourine, bongos
 Graham Walsh – additional tracking
 Jeff McMurrich – additional tracking
 John Agnello – mixing
 Ian McGettigan – additional mixing
 Greg Calbi – mastering engineer
 Steve Fallone – additional mastering

References

2013 singles
2013 songs
Alvvays songs